Frank Kerlin ( – 19 November 1934) was an Irish Fianna Fáil politician and revolutionary.

Early years
Frank Kerlin grew up at 15 Wexford Street, Dublin and attended secondary school at Synge Street CBS, Dublin. He later studied in the National University of Ireland (University College Dublin). He joined the Fianna Éireann in 1915.

Revolutionary period
During the Irish War of Independence, he transferred to C Company, 3 Battalion, Dublin Brigade, IRA in summer 1920. Frank Kerlin was captured on 21 June 1921 after an ambush of British forces on Dartmouth Road. He was held in Kilmainham Jail until release in early 1922 in the Truce period. Re-joining his unit, Kerlin took the anti-Treaty side in the Civil War and in Autumn 1922 joined the General Headquarters (GHQ) staff.=

According to Dublin Made Me, Todd Andrews' memoir, Kerlin was deputy Director of Intelligence during the Irish Civil War to Michael Carolan. "His signature 'K' became famous. The Free State forces never caught up with him," wrote Andrews, who added: "Had he lived, I think he would have been a major force in Irish politics". 

Kerlin was captured in January 1923 by National forces but escaped shortly afterwards. Going on the run, he claims that he was allowed to return home in April 1924 owing to the death of his mother. He replaced Michael Carolan as IRA Director of Intelligence and served in that capacity from July 1925 to March 1927.

Politics
Kerlin was elected to Dáil Éireann as a Fianna Fáil Teachta Dála (TD) for the Dublin South constituency at the September 1927 general election. He did not contest the 1932 general election.

Death
Kerlin died from TB aged 32 on 13 November 1934 at his residence "Ardnashee" in Dundrum, County Dublin. He was single and had no children.

References

Year of birth missing
1934 deaths
Fianna Fáil TDs
Members of the 6th Dáil
Politicians from County Dublin